Yuvajanotsavam is a 1986 Indian Malayalam romantic comedy film written, directed, and produced by Shrikumaran Thampi. It stars Mohanlal, Urvashi, Menaka and Ashokan. The music and  background by Raveendran.   The film marks the return of Suresh Gopi, who started his career as a child artist in Odayil Ninnu (1965).

Plot
The film is about three friends who are caught in a love triangle.

Cast

Mohanlal as Jayan
Urvashi as Sindhu
Menaka as Nirmala
Suresh Gopi as Dileep
Ashokan as Jacob Zakharia
Maniyanpilla Raju as Bhagaval Das
K. B. Ganesh Kumar as Rajeevan
Krishnachandran as Omanakuttan
Santhosh as Nissar
Sukumari as Nirmala's Mother
Innocent as Kunjunni Nair
Janardhanan as Unnithan
KPAC Lalitha as MLA Arundhathi
Jagannatha Varma as SP Dharmapalan
Kamal Roy as Unni
Prathapachandran as Sakhavu P. K.
Kollam Ajith as Das
Mohan Jose
Kollam Thulasi
Lalithasree
Poojappura Radhakrishnan as Vattavila Ramanan
Poojappura Ravi
Lathika
Nandhu as Prince
Suresh Bheemsingh as Shiva Chidambaram
Kalaranjini as Bhagaval Das's wife (Guest appearance)

Soundtrack

References

External links

 

1980s Malayalam-language films
1980s romance films
Indian romance films
Indian romantic comedy films
Films directed by Sreekumaran Thampi